Tomorrow is a 1987 studio album by South African trumpeter Hugh Masekela.

Reception
Richard S. Ginell of Allmusic wrote: "Still in exile from his homeland, Hugh Masekela leaves no doubt where he would rather be in this carefully produced, majestically swinging, techno-pop-jazz album that leans heavily in the direction of Soweto. Masekela often performs sophisticated takes on three-chord township jive, leading the massed vocals with his own coarse yet evocatively blunt voice, while leaving himself just enough room to peel off a few patented, repeated-note trumpet licks and double-tracked flugelhorn statements. Later on the record, the keys turn minor but the high-tech verve is still there. The key track is a fine version of Masekela's signature tune of the '80s, 'Bring Him Back Home,' which became prophetic in the next decade with the release of Nelson Mandela from prison (though the 'walking hand in hand with Winnie Mandela' bit didn't last long)." Robert Christgau commented: "The words document his losses, his struggle, his oppression as a South African exile. I learned from them, and that's high praise for any lyric. The music documents the life he wants to lead, which is as corny as any other dance-fusion jazz played by musicians overimpressed with their own chops. He has a right to that life, obviously. Just as obviously, I have a right to pursue my own life elsewhere."

Track listing

Personnel
Band
Hugh Masekela – horn, percussion, producer, trumpet, vocals
Don Freeman – flute, keyboards, producer, saxophone, synthesizer
Francis Fuster – congas, percussion
Patricia Knight – vocals
Billy Lovelady –  guitar
Mark Millington – tenor saxophone
Sonti Mndebele – vocals
Clive Mngaza – drums
Banjo Mosele – guitar
Tu Nokwe – vocals
Aubrey Obert Oaki – bass
Michael Osapanin – trombone
John Selolwane – guitar, backing vocals
Beverley Skeete – vocals
Richard Stevens – drums
Michael Timothy – keyboards, synthesizer
Tsepo Tshola – vocals
Mopati Tsienyane – drums, vocals

Production
Stuart Barry – engineer
Geoffrey Haslam – producer

References

External links

1987 albums
Hugh Masekela albums